Travis Carter (born November 21, 1949) is a former car owner and crew chief in the NASCAR Winston Cup Series. He served as crew chief for two decades, winning a championship with Benny Parsons in 1973. Carter was the winning crew chief when Parsons won the 1975 Daytona 500. He owned Travis Carter Motorsports from 1970 to 2003. He is the uncle of NASCAR crew chief Larry Carter, and the father of NASCAR driver Matt Carter.

References

External links
 
 
 

Living people
1949 births
People from Denver, North Carolina
NASCAR crew chiefs
NASCAR team owners
People from Ellerbe, North Carolina